Veprecula brunonia is a species of sea snail, a marine gastropod mollusk in the family Raphitomidae.

Description
The length of the shell attains 3 mm.

(Original description) The minute shell shows an absurdly accurate resemblance to the large species of Turricula. It has inflated whorls, a constricted suture and a relatively long siphonal canal. The holotype has a slender brown protoconch of four long axially ribbed whorls and three and a half subsequent inflated whorls. The shell shows seven axial ribs, and a deep anal sulcus close to the suture.

Distribution
This marine species occurs off Hawaii and Réunion

References

External links
 
  Kay, E. A. (1979). Hawaiian marine shells. Reef and shore fauna of Hawaii. Section 4: Mollusca. Bernice P. Bishop Museum Special Publications. 64xviii + 1-653
 Moretzsohn, Fabio, and E. Alison Kay. "HAWAIIAN MARINE MOLLUSCS." (1995)
 Biolib.cz: image
 Gastropods.com: Veprecula brunonia

brunonia
Gastropods described in 1924